A History of Violence is a graphic novel written by John Wagner and illustrated by Vince Locke, originally published in 1997 by Paradox Press and later by Vertigo Comics, both imprints of DC Comics.

It is also the source for the film of the same name directed by David Cronenberg, the first cinematic adaption of a work by John Wagner since 1995's Judge Dredd.

Plot summary

Small town Michigan cafe owner Tom McKenna becomes a local hero after defending his store from an attempted robbery. Despite his efforts to avoid the limelight, Tom's story receives national attention. 

Tom is soon visited by three men who are later revealed to be associates of the New York City Mafia. Their leader, John Torrino, an aging hitman who lost an eye, alleges that Tom is actually named Joey, who crossed him 20 years earlier. Torrino notices that Tom is missing a finger on his left hand and pulls out a pendant containing a severed finger, claiming he took it from Joey during their last encounter. Tom's wife Edie intervenes and orders the men to leave before she calls the police. The men comply but Edie still calls Sheriff Frank Carney, who confronts the mobsters but then later questions Tom as to whether they might have something against him. 

Tom vehemently protests his innocence to everyone but he is eventually forced to drop his façade when Torrino and his accomplices take the McKennas' son Buzz hostage in order to draw out Tom.  Tom manages to thwart their plan and kill the other two mobsters, while Edie shoots Torrino in defense of her husband.

At the hospital, Tom finally admits to Edie and Buzz that he is in fact Joey and reveals why he left New York and changed his identity. He and his childhood friend Richie pulled off a well-planned and spectacular heist, killing local crime boss Lou Manzi and several of his associates. This event was perpetrated mostly by Richie in retaliation for the murder of his older brother. Tom, then known by his real name Joey Muni, only agreed to help so he could acquire the money that his grandmother needed for an expensive medical procedure on her heart. Richie foolishly chose to flaunt his take, which allowed Torrino and his cronies to identify him as one of the robbers. Using a woman as bait, they lured Richie to a derelict apartment building where he was tortured and presumably killed, but not before naming Joey as his accomplice. Joey narrowly escaped the same fate, losing his finger to and taking an eye from Torrino in the process, and fled the city with the intent of starting over with a new identity, eventually changing his name to Tom McKenna. 

Tom is eventually forced to confess all of this to the police after DNA analysis reveals that the finger Torrino kept is his. Fortunately for him, his lawyer arrives and learns that the police failed to Mirandize him, which makes his confession inadmissible in court.

Prior to his confession to the police, Tom learns that Richie is still alive and being held captive by someone later revealed to be Manzi's sadistic son, Little Lou, who has assumed control over his father's territory. Tom and Edie send their children to stay with relatives while the two of them fly to New York to deal with related legal matters. He arranges a meeting with Manzi at a warehouse where he dispatches three more men and maims a fourth, who leaves a blood trail that helps the police track down his location later on. 

Tom finds Richie hanging in a harness, having been horribly mutilated and tortured for twenty years. Manzi arrives and subdues Tom by hitting him with a baseball bat. He then hangs Tom by his wrists next to Richie and prepares to torture him. Tom thwarts Manzi by wrapping his legs around Manzi's head, causing Manzi to lose his balance and fall backward, bringing Tom down with him. Tom grabs a gun and prepares to shoot Manzi but finds it is empty. Manzi attacks Tom with a chainsaw, but Tom deflects the blade with his shackles. Manzi slips and falls onto the blade, killing him. Tom tells Richie he will get him to a hospital but Richie, no longer wanting to live, begs Tom to help him die instead. Tom suffocates Richie in an act of euthanasia shortly before the police arrive. As Tom is loaded onto an ambulance, he assures Edie that it is all over.

Awards 
The book was nominated for the 2006 Angoulême International Comics Festival Prize for Scenario.

Film adaptation 

In 2005 the novel was adapted into a film by David Cronenberg, starring Viggo Mortensen.

While the first half of the film is faithful to the source, the remainder of the film takes many liberties with the story. Some changes are relatively minor (in the film, the main character's name is Tom Stall, he lives in Indiana and the gangsters pursuing him are from a Philadelphia-based Irish Mob), the main character's brother, played by William Hurt, bears virtually no resemblance to the corresponding character in the graphic novel.

The film's reviews were largely favorable and it garnered recognition at the Cannes Film Festival, as well as Academy Award nominations for Hurt (Best Performance by an Actor in a Supporting Role) and writer Josh Olson (Best Writing, Screenplay Based on Material Previously Produced or Published).

In a March 2009 issue of Now, comic book experts Christopher Butcher and Peter Birkemoe praised the film while panning the original comic.

Notes

References

1997 graphic novels
American comics adapted into films
Comics by John Wagner
Crime comics
Action comics
DC Comics adapted into films
DC Comics graphic novels
Paradox Press titles
Vertigo Comics titles